Naïm Sliti (born 27 July 1992) is a professional footballer who plays as an attacking midfielder for Al-Ettifaq. Born in France, he plays for the Tunisia national team.

International career
Sliti was born in Marseille, France, to parents of Tunisian descent. He made his debut for the Tunisia national team in a 2017 Africa Cup of Nations qualification 3–0 victory against Djibouti on 3 June 2016, wherein he scored his debut goal.

In June 2018 he was selected in the final 23-man squad for the 2018 FIFA World Cup in Russia.

Career statistics

International

International goals

Scores and results list Tunisia's goal tally first, score column indicates score after each Sliti goal.

Honors
Tunisia
Kirin Cup: 2022
Africa Cup of Nations 4 place:2019

Individual
 Saudi Professional League Player of the Month: December 2020, November 2021, May & June 2022

References

External links

Naïm Sliti profile at Foot-National.com

1992 births
Living people
Tunisian footballers
Tunisian expatriate footballers
Tunisia international footballers
French footballers
French sportspeople of Tunisian descent
CS Sedan Ardennes players
Paris FC players
Red Star F.C. players
Lille OSC players
Dijon FCO players
Ettifaq FC players
Ligue 1 players
Ligue 2 players
Saudi Professional League players
Footballers from Marseille
Association football midfielders
2017 Africa Cup of Nations players
2018 FIFA World Cup players
2019 Africa Cup of Nations players
Expatriate footballers in Saudi Arabia
Tunisian expatriate sportspeople in Saudi Arabia
2021 Africa Cup of Nations players
2022 FIFA World Cup players